Rusham Park is an industrial site in Egham, Surrey, England. It was formally owned by Shell, Richardson Vicks, and Procter & Gamble. It is now owned by Royal Holloway University.  It was named after Rusham Farm.

The four-acre site consists of ten buildings built and renovated at different times, giving it a collegiate look.  It also contains gardens, green space and a multi-story carpark.

The university has considered its options and now wishes to proceed with an alternative-use redevelopment strategy for this major developed site in the Green Belt. The intent is to seek outline planning permission to redevelop the Rusham Park site as a new Student Village after Procter & Gamble have vacated the site in 2021. Phase 1 will compensate for the loss of the 1,400 study bedrooms.

Shell
From 1956 through to about 1975, Shell Central Laboratories consolidated combustion  research to Rusham Park.  From 1960, this included a combustion laboratory, built by architects Walker Howard and Cranswick.

Richardson Vicks International and Norwich Eaton
Richardson Vicks International moved into the site circa 1975. Norwich Eaton Pharmaceuticals was also based on the site.

Procter & Gamble

P&G acquired RVI in Autumn 1985.  During the time P&G owned it, it was called Egham Technical Centre, Rusham Park Technical Centre, London Innovation Centre, and Greater London Innovation Centre.  In July 2015, P&G sold 43 of its beauty brands to Coty in a £15 billion deal, and Coty became a major tenant of the site. P&G put the site up for sale, likely so they were not landlord to their competitor who took over many of the buildings.

Royal Holloway University
Royal Holloway acquired the site in July 2016, but leased it back to P&G and Coty.

According to current planning application with Runnymede, the plans are for the demolition of existing buildings and erection of purpose built student accommodation up to 1,400 study bedrooms, energy centre and ancillary uses, including a pedestrian footbridge over the railway, and associated landscaping - ("a student village") on land at Rusham Park, Whitehall Lane, Egham, Surrey.

References

Borough of Runnymede